Henry Charles Wheeler (10 November 1861 – 1 April 1935) was an Australian politician.

He was born at St Albans to schoolmaster William Wheeler and Eliza Martha. From 1895 to 1898 he was the Free Trade member for Northumberland in the New South Wales Legislative Assembly. An Anglican bachelor, he died at Paddington in 1935, at which time he was a sharebroker.

References

 

1861 births
1935 deaths
Members of the New South Wales Legislative Assembly
Free Trade Party politicians